Gaisa Khamidullovich Enikeev (variant of the name — Aisa, surname — Enikiev; ; July 2, 1864, Orenburg Governorate — March 1931, Ufa) was a teacher, ethnographer, and deputy of the State Duma in its third and fourth convocations from the Kazan and Orenburg Governorates from 1907 to 1917. He paid special attention to the protection of the interests of the Muslim population of Russian Empire. Prior to his election to the Duma, he served as the director of a cloth factory in Simbirsk Governorate and the chief administrator of the charitable and educational institutions of Kazan. He was a member of the Provisional Committee of the State Duma in the period of the February Revolution and the organizer of the First All-Russian Muslim Congress in May 1917. During the Soviet era, he was a member of the board of the Vyatka Commissariat of Education and an inspector of Bashselkhozkredit; became also known as a professional connoisseur of Tatar and Bashkir folklore.

Literature 
 Еникеев Гайса Хамидуллович (in Russian) // Государственная дума Российской империи: 1906—1917 / Б. Ю. Иванов, А. А. Комзолова, И. С. Ряховская. — Москва: РОССПЭН, 2008. — P. 184—185. — 735 p. — .
 Члены Государственной думы: (портреты и биографии): Четвертый созыв, 1912—1917 г. / сост. М. М. Боиович. — Москва: Тип. Т-ва И. Д. Сытина, 1913. — P. 208. — LXIV, 454, [2] p. (in Russian)
 Ихтисамов Х. С., Ямаева Л. А. Еникеев Гайса Хамидуллович (in Russian) // Башкирская энциклопедия. — Уфа: ГАУН «Башкирская энциклопедия», 2013. — .

1864 births
1931 deaths
People from Bashkortostan
People from Belebeyevsky Uyezd
Russian Constitutional Democratic Party members
Members of the 3rd State Duma of the Russian Empire
Members of the 4th State Duma of the Russian Empire
Folklorists from the Russian Empire